Ornduffia parnassifolia is a species of plant in the Menyanthaceae family of wetland plants that is endemic to Western Australia.

Description
The species is an emergent semi-aquatic herb with bright yellow, star-shaped flowers which appear on panicles throughout the year.

Distribution and habitat
The species occurs in the Esperance Plains, Jarrah Forest, Swan Coastal Plain and Warren IBRA bioregions of Southwest Australia. It is found in swamps and other seasonal wetlands along the southern coast from south of Bunbury to east of Esperance.

References

parnassifolia
Asterales of Australia
Eudicots of Western Australia
Taxa named by Jacques Labillardière
Plants described in 1805